Moomba is a constituency of the National Assembly of Zambia. It covers part of Monze District in Southern Province.

List of MPs

References 

Constituencies of the National Assembly of Zambia
1983 establishments in Zambia
Constituencies established in 1983